The Liberian Super Cup is a pre-season football competition held the week before the season begins in Liberia every year, in April. It is contested by the winners of the National Premier League and the Liberian Cup in the previous season, as a curtain raiser to the new season. It is played at the Antoinette Tubman Stadium.

Winners

See also
Liberia national football team

References

External links
Liberiansoccer.com - "the official home of Liberian football" - "FIFA approved" - current official standings provided

Football competitions in Liberia
National association football cups